IBM ThinkPad 310 was a notebook computer series introduced in 1997 by the IBM corporation into the market as part of their ThinkPad laptop series. It was succeeded by the ThinkPad 380 series.

Features
All models shipped with Windows 95 OSR2 but were capable of running up to Windows XP, if they have a sufficient RAM upgrade, as well as several Linux variations. They could also run older operating systems such as Windows 3.1.

All models featured a Socket 7 Intel Pentium I or MMX processor running at 133 to 166 MHz, a CT-65550 video chip with 1 MB of video memory, and a Yamaha YMF715 audio controller. The standard memory size was 16 MB, with up to 32 MB max if upgraded.

The ThinkPad models ending with a D included a CD-ROM drive, the rest included a 1.44 MB floppy disk drive. Ones that had a CD-ROM drive had a proprietary external floppy disk drive port on the back.

Models
IBM ThinkPad 310 — The base model released only in Europe, it featured an Intel Pentium I running at 133 MHz, 16 MB of soldered EDO RAM, standard 1.08 GB hard drive, and a non-removable 1.44MB floppy disk drive. It also had an 11.3" 800x600 DSTN display with the additional option of an 11.3" 800x600 TFT display. Other features included: NiHM battery, Trackpoint, (2) Type II CardBus slots or (1) type III.
IBM ThinkPad 310D — Released alongside the 310 but available worldwide, it had essentially the same specifications as the base 310 model, with the only difference of a CD-ROM drive over the 1.44 floppy disk drive. It also only had an 11.3" 800x600 DSTN display over the base 310's additional TFT display option.
IBM ThinkPad 310E — Made available late 1997, the E had a few new features. It featured an Intel Pentium MMX 166 MHz processor, 16 MB of soldered EDO RAM, 1.6 or 2.1 GB hard drive size options, and a 1.44 MB floppy disk drive. It came with a larger 12.1" 800x600 DSTN display with the additional option of an 11.3" 800x600 TFT display. It also came with a NiHM battery which could last up to 2.8 hours on one charge. Other features included: Trackpoint, (2) Type II CardBus slots or (1) type III.
IBM ThinkPad 310ED — The last model in the series also available late 1997, it was basically the same as the 310E, with the only difference of a CD-ROM drive and only offering a 12.1" 800x600 DSTN display  option. The 310ED introduced the additional option to come standard with 32 MB of ram.

Comparison

References

External links 
 Thinkwiki.de - 310
 Thinkwiki.org - 310

ThinkPad 310
310